Hazeleigh is a village and civil parish on the Dengie peninsula in the English county of Essex. It lies 2.6 miles south-west of Maldon.

Hazeleigh's Parish Council 
Hazeleigh and the neighbouring village of Woodham Mortimer share a joint Parish Council which meets monthly at Woodham Mortimer Village Hall.

Hazeleigh's churches 
Hazeleigh's original timber-framed Church, St. Nicholas's, was located in an isolated part of the village, next to the Old Hall, but by 1900 had fallen into disuse. Due to its size and lack of windows it was known locally as "the meanest church in England".  It was pulled down in about 1922, although the last service had been held several years earlier, in 1906.  One of the reasons it fell into disuse was that an iron church was built in a more populous part of the village by the late-Victorian vicar, Rev. William Stuart (brother of Robert Stuart and father of William Horwood Stuart, both diplomats).  This iron church was later demolished as well, though, and the parish of Hazeleigh is now incorporated into that of Woodham Mortimer.

List of rectors 
Rev. George Raynor, B.A. (1869-1889)
Rev. William Stuart, M.A. (1889-1896)
Rev. Gilbert Henry Raynor, M.A. (1896-1921)
Rev. Nathaniel Gentry (1708-1709 - Church Register)

External links
Photo of St. Nicholas's Church before demolition
 History of Hazeleigh including the story of Hazeleigh Church
 Information of Hazeleigh and contact for the Parish Council

References
The collection of short stories The Night Chicago Died, contains a story entitled The Meanest Church in England which references Hazeleigh.

Villages in Essex
Maldon District